Pastor Leopold v. Otto also Leopold Marcin von Otto (2 November 1819 in Warsaw - 22 September 1882 in Warsaw) was a Lutheran pastor of the German community in Warsaw and Poland and a national activist, participant of the patriotic manifestation of 1861 in Warsaw. In 1866–1875 Otto worked in Cieszyn. He published a book about the "Deutsche Evangelische Gemeinde" (German Protestant Community Zwiastun Ewangeliczny) and also wrote sermons and religious writings.

In theology, he was a supporter of Lutheran orthodoxy and starkly rejected liberal theology and rationalistic interpretation of the Bible.

His second wife was Emilia Izabela Linde (1826–1857), daughter of Samuel Linde, Polish linguist.

Works 
Beitrag zur Geschichte der Evangelisch-Augsburgischen Gemeinde zu Warschau, Druck bei A Gins, Warschau 1882
Rozmyślania i kazania (1887)
Dra ks Leopolda Marcina Otto rozmyślania i kazania (1887)
Postyla, czyli Wykład ewangelij i listów na wszystkie niedziele i święta uroczyste roku kościelnego (1892)
Wykład Objawienia św. Jana (1904)
Mniejszy katechizm Marcina Lutra Doktora św. Teologji (1916)

Further reading 

Polish Lutheran clergy
Polish people of German descent
People from Cieszyn Silesia
Clergy from Warsaw
1819 births
1882 deaths